Philip Dulebohn (born September 13, 1973 in Silver Spring, Maryland) is an American pair skater. He competed in pairs with partner Tiffany Scott, and the duo won the gold medal at the 2003 U.S. Figure Skating Championships. He and Scott ended their partnership in 2005, and now Dulebohn coaches at the University of Delaware ice arena in Newark, Delaware.

His brother, Paul Dulebohn, was also a competitive skater.

Results

Men's singles

Pairs with Tiffany Scott

Programs  
(with Scott)

References

External links

Navigation

Olympic figure skaters of the United States
1973 births
American male pair skaters
Figure skaters at the 2002 Winter Olympics
Living people
Four Continents Figure Skating Championships medalists
20th-century American people
21st-century American people